Proplerodia is a genus of longhorn beetles of the subfamily Lamiinae, containing the following species:

 Proplerodia goyana Martins & Galileo, 1990
 Proplerodia piriana Martins & Galileo, 2009

References

Onciderini